Gregoir [Gregory, Gregorius] (died 1195) is the third known 12th century Bishop of Ross, an episcopal see then based at Rosemarkie.

Biography
According to the Chronicle of Melrose, Gregoir was consecrated by Ernald, Bishop of St Andrews acting as a Papal legate, in 1161.

He occurred in a document of Scone Abbey in either 1163 or 1164, namely in "the eleventh year of Malcolm", the year ending 23 May 1164. He witnessed a charter issued at Inverness by King William the Lion, datable to between 1172 and 1174, confirming a gift of land made by Simon de Tosny, Bishop of Moray, to a hermit in Inverness-shire. Little more is known of his episcopate.

The Chronicle of Melrose reported his death in 1195, and the election of his successor Reinald Macer in March of that year. The English chronicler Roger of Howden gave his death-date for the same year, and added that it fell in the month of February.

See also

Notes

References
 Anderson, Alan Orr, Early Sources of Scottish History, 2 vols, (Edinburgh, 1922)
 Barrow, G. W. S. (ed.), The Acts of William I (Regesta Regum Scottorum vol. ii),  (Edinburgh, 1971)
 Dowden, John, The Bishops of Scotland, ed. J. Maitland Thomson, (Glasgow, 1912)
 Keith, Robert, An Historical Catalogue of the Scottish Bishops: Down to the Year 1688, (London, 1924)
 Watt, D. E. R., Fasti Ecclesiae Scotinanae Medii Aevi ad annum 1638, 2nd Draft, (St Andrews, 1969)

External links
Dauvit Broun's list of 12th century Scottish Bishops

1195 deaths
12th-century Scottish Roman Catholic bishops
Bishops of Ross (Scotland)
Year of birth unknown